Moto X4 is an Android smartphone developed by Motorola Mobility, a subsidiary of Lenovo. Unveiled on August 31, 2017, at IFA, it is a revival of the previously discontinued Moto X line. It was released in Europe at the end of September 2017.

In the United States, an Android One version of the device was also released, marking the first device to be released in the US as part of the Android One program. In 2018, Motorola launched the Motorola One lineup as upper mid-range replacements for the Moto X4.

Specifications

Hardware 
The Moto X4 is equipped with a   IPS display. It comes in two colors: Super Black and Sterling Blue. The camera assembly protrudes from the body, as on almost all Motorola smartphones in production. The fingerprint sensor is an oval on the front. The front has a front-facing camera with flash, LED notification light, and the proximity sensor in the top bezel. The back has the dual camera at the top and one of the secondary noise-cancellation microphones at the bottom. The sides are an aluminium frame, which holds the front and back glass. The phone's USB type C charging port has a USB-OTG function, supported by a USB type C OTG connector. Its Moto Turbopower fast-charging technology can add about 5 hours of battery life with 15–20 minutes of charging. It also has a 3.5mm headphone jack at the bottom along with the manufacturing details. The SIM-card tray can support either two nano SIM cards or a nano SIM card and a microSD card of up to 2TB of capacity.  The phone is IP68 rated.

Memory and Storage 
The Moto X4 comes in three memory variants: 3GB / 32GB, 4GB / 64GB, and 6GB / 64GB.

Processor 
The Moto X4 uses the Qualcomm Snapdragon 630 SoC at 2.2GHz, and the Adreno 508 GPU at 650MHz. Together, these provide a decent performance in terms of general browsing. Most games supported by the hardware run without lag.

Battery 
The Moto X4 comes with a 3000mAh Li-ion non-removable battery that Motorola claims can provide a full day of usage. Users typically report the same, with a few exceptions. Along with the Moto Turbopower technology, the battery performance of the phone is good.

Camera 
The device features a dual rear camera, in a raised circular camera bump. It contains a 12MP 2.0 1.4μm dual autofocus pixel sensor combined with an 8MP 2.2 1.12μm wide-angle sensor which has a 120° field-of-view. The dual camera system allows the camera to use depth effects, selective focus and black and white and background replacement. The rear camera has a color-corrected–temperature dual LED flash.

The front-facing camera is a 16MP 2.0 1μm sensor with a front-facing LED flash. It also has a 4MP adaptive night mode for low light levels, with the new system update enabling the portrait mode for it as well.

Software 
The X4 launched with Android Nougat version 7.1 and can be updated (in most regions) to Android 9.0 Pie. The Prime Exclusive model currently is sold running Android Oreo. It also contains Amazon's Alexa voice assistant in addition to the standard Google Assistant offered in all android phones and Motorola's own assistant Moto Voice. It also has several other Moto experiences; one-button-nav, Moto Display, Moto Actions, Moto Key and wireless sound system.

Android 9.0 Pie upgrade rollout began December 17, 2018 in the US and most other regions, including some European regions. The UK got Pie on June 24, 2019. Some may still be "pending".

Although the default Camera app does not provide support for Photo Sphere photos, Photo Sphere images may be taken through use of the Google Street View app. Normal Panorama images may be taken with the Camera app, however.

Android One version 
The Moto X4 Android One edition is the first device to be released as part of the Android One program in the United States. It is only available in the US and works on Google's Project Fi network, which had previously been exclusive to Google's own Nexus or Pixel phones. The Android One version does not include the Amazon Alexa assistant and some Motorola software additions, and will receive Android updates from Motorola faster than the regular version of the device.

Release supply issues
The X4 was originally made available to buy on September 21, 2017, in France, Germany, and the United Kingdom via the Motorola website, and proved popular with many customers ordering it within a few days of release. However, Motorola was unable to meet the demand due to manufacturing and shipping issues, with many customers having their orders cancelled and refunded after the expected delivery dates. It has since been removed from sale in some countries or is showing as out of stock in others. Project Fi X4's were also hit by the issues and customers who had made pre-orders were contacted, delaying their delivery dates by around 2 weeks. The launch of the phone in India was also postponed, having originally been planned for 3 October.

References

External links 

 moto x4 Product Home

Mobile phones introduced in 2017
Mobile phones with multiple rear cameras
Mobile phones with 4K video recording